Mario Rafael Díaz Torres (born January 10, 1962, in Humacao, Puerto Rico) is a former Major League Baseball infielder. On September 12, 1987, he recorded his first Major League hit, a triple, off of Bob James.

External links

1962 births
Living people
Bakersfield Mariners players
Bellingham Mariners players
Calgary Cannons players
Chattanooga Lookouts players
Columbus Clippers players
Florida Marlins players
Leones de Yucatán players
Lynn Sailors players
Major League Baseball players from Puerto Rico
Major League Baseball infielders
Nashua Pride players
New York Mets players
Oklahoma City 89ers players
Pawtucket Red Sox players
People from Humacao, Puerto Rico
Puerto Rican expatriate baseball players in Canada
Puerto Rican expatriate baseball players in Mexico
Salt Lake City Gulls players
Scranton/Wilkes-Barre Red Barons players
Seattle Mariners players
Texas Rangers players
Wausau Timbers players